John Carew (5 May 1901 – 12 July 1968) was an Irish Fine Gael politician. He was elected to Dáil Éireann as a Fine Gael Teachta Dála (TD) for the Limerick East constituency at the 1952 by-election caused by the death of Daniel Bourke of Fianna Fáil. He was re-elected at the 1954 and 1957 general elections but lost his seat at the 1961 general election.

He was a member of Limerick City Council from 1942 until his death in 1968, and was Mayor of Limerick from 1953 to 1954 and 1959 to 1960.

References

1901 births
1968 deaths
Fine Gael TDs
Members of the 14th Dáil
Members of the 15th Dáil
Members of the 16th Dáil
Politicians from County Limerick
Mayors of Limerick (city)